The Dutch Student Union (LSVb; lit. "National Student Union"), founded in 1983, is one of the two national students' unions of the Netherlands. LSVb represents the interests of university and hogeschool (vocational university) students in eight Dutch municipalities, often collaborating with the Dutch National Students Association (ISO).

LSVb is a full member of the European Students' Union.

Member organisations
LSVb is a federation of nine constituent students' unions:

References

External links
 

1983 establishments in the Netherlands
Groups of students' unions
Student organisations in the Netherlands